Charles Julius Conrad (November 28, 1909 - January 15, 1998) served in the California State Assembly for the 57th district from 1947 to 1973 and during World War II, he served in the United States Coast Guard.  He was defeated in 1972 by Howard Berman.

Conrad also was an actor who appeared on Sergeant Preston of the Yukon and Perry Mason TV shows.

References

External Links

United States Coast Guard personnel of World War II
Members of the California State Legislature
1909 births
1998 deaths
20th-century American politicians
American actor-politicians
American male television actors